Poffertjes are a traditional Dutch batter treat. Resembling small, fluffy pancakes, they are made with yeast and buckwheat flour. Typically, poffertjes are a sweet treat, served with powdered sugar and butter, and sometimes syrup or advocaat. However, there is also a savoury variant with gouda cheese.

History
Poffertjes, also known as 'brothers', originated from a Catholic tradition.
In the churches in the south of the Netherlands, sacramental host was eaten during the communion ceremony. Because the host was very dry, the brothers started experimenting with different recipes. From these culinary experiments the poffertjes that we know today have emerged. The south of present-day Netherlands was traditionally Catholic, so the traditions deviated from the Protestant north. Because the host was part of a Catholic tradition, it is suspected that the poffertjes were created in the provinces of Limburg or North Brabant.

Servings
Poffertjes are a festive holiday treat in the Netherlands, popular at both summer festivals and Christmas markets. Mainly in the winter season temporary stands selling poffertjes are quite popular and sell portions containing one or two dozen. Usually the cook prepares them fresh for the customer. They are sold on a small cardboard (sometimes plastic) plate and come with a small disposable fork the size of a pastry fork. Poffertjes are not difficult to prepare, but a special cast iron pan or copper pan (also available in aluminium with Teflon coating) with several shallow indentations in the bottom is required.

Almost all Dutch supermarkets (like Albert Heijn, Lidl and Jumbo) sell ready-made poffertjes that only need to be microwaved, and are sold complete with a sachet of powdered sugar and a small serving of butter. Supermarkets also stock mixes for poffertjes, to which only eggs and milk need to be added. Usually they contain a leavening agent such as baking powder.

Poffertjes can also be served with other sweet garnishes, such as syrup, whipped cream or strawberries, for added flavour.

Poffertjes are also known in Indonesian cuisine through its historical ties as the former Dutch colony. Poffertjes are also regularly found on German Christmas markets.

Similar dishes
Poffertjes are thought to be related to and to have influenced the Indonesian kue cubit. Poffertjes have some similarities with Indian paniyaram and Hong Kong egg waffles, but differ in many aspects.  The Danish Æbleskiver pancakes are quite similar.

See also

 , a similar Hong Kong dish
 , a similar dish from the south of India that comes in sweet and savory varieties
 , a similar dish utilizing coconuts found in Thailand and Indonesia.
 , a similar savory Japanese dish filled with diced octopus

References

External links

The Dutch Table - Poffertjes

Dutch pastries
Dutch words and phrases
Indonesian snack foods
Pancakes
Snack foods
Buckwheat dishes